Kirkfield Park is a provincial electoral division in the Canadian province of Manitoba. It was created by redistribution in 1979, and has formally existed since the provincial election of 1981.  The riding is located in the westernmost tip of the City of Winnipeg. It contains the neighbourhoods of Glendale, Westwood, Kirkfield Park, Woodhaven, Birchwood, Booth, Silver Heights and part of Assiniboia Downs

Kirkfield Park is bordered to the east by St. James, to the south and west by Charleswood, and to the north by Assiniboia. The St Charles and Glendale Country Clubs are in this riding, as are the Chapel Lawn Memorial Gardens and Assumption Cemetery.

The riding's population in 1996 was 20,236. In 1999, the average family income was $63,038, and the unemployment rate was 5.80%. Almost 13% of the riding's population are immigrants, including 6% German and 5% Ukrainian. Over twenty per cent of the riding's residents are over 65 years of age.

The service sector accounts for 15% of Kirkfield Park's industry, followed by 13% in retail trade.

Previously held by Progressive Conservatives, the seat was won by the New Democratic Party in 2007.

List of provincial representatives

Electoral results

^ Change is from redistributed results

Previous boundaries

References

Manitoba provincial electoral districts
Politics of Winnipeg